Lai Jin (Chinese: 赖劲; born 1 February 1991 in Xingning) is a Chinese football player.

Club career
In 2011, Lai Jin started his professional footballer career with Shenzhen Ruby in the Chinese Super League. He would eventually make his league debut for Shenzhen on 15 April 2011 in a game against Shanghai Shenhua, coming on as a substitute for Ermin Rakovič in the 46th minute.

Career statistics 
Statistics accurate as of match played 16 October 2017

References

1991 births
Living people
Chinese footballers
Footballers from Meizhou
Shenzhen F.C. players
Chinese Super League players
China League One players
Hakka sportspeople
People from Xingning
Association football midfielders